Raipur-Bhilai-Durg Expressway is a  high-speed urban expressway which links Raipur- Bhilai and Durg on Asian Highway 46 (India) (AH-46) in the state of Chhattisgarh. The expressway also connects Chhattisgarh with Visakhapatnam, one of the most important ports of India.
The expressway has two toll stations installed, one at Kharun - at the entry point of the expressway from Raipur and the other at Kutelabhata - at the exit point of the expressway towards Bhilai.

The construction work of Raipur-Bhilai Expressway Project, worth Rs 95 crore was awarded by the National Highways Authority of India to DS Constructions Ltd (DSC). The expressway has been constructed on a Build-Operate-Transfer (BOT) basis with a concession period of 11 years 9 months, including the construction period of the project. The work included four laning of the existing two-lane carriageway on the Raipur-Bhilai section of NH-6 in Chhattisgarh. This has reduced the travel time between Raipur and Bhilai.

See also
 Durg - Raipur - Arang Expressway: a proposed and upcoming 92 km long greenfield expressway.

References

Expressways in Chhattisgarh
Proposed roads in India
Roads in Chhattisgarh
Transport in Durg
Transport in Raipur, Chhattisgarh
Transport in Bhilai